COI, CoI or Coi may refer to:

Organizations
 Center on Organizational Innovation, a research center at Columbia University
 Central Office of Information, a former UK Government department
 Church of Ireland, an autonomous province of the Anglican Communion
 College of Idaho, a university
 Commission de l'Océan Indien, or Indian Ocean Commission

Science and technology
 California Oregon Intertie or Path 66, an electrical power transmission system
 Centre of inertia
 Coefficient of Inbreeding, the probability that two alleles at a given locus are identical by descent
 Community of inquiry, a concept describing the social quality of scientific inquiry
 Community of interest (computer security), a computer networking technique of segregation of resources
 Confirmed opt-in, a policy for obtaining mailing list recipients
 Contingency Orbit Insertion, an abort mode of the Apollo spacecraft
 Cost of illness, see Disease burden
 Cytochrome Oxidase Subunit 1, a gene
 Coprocessor Offload Infrastructure, a high-level software library for code and data offloading to a Xeon Phi Coprocessor

Other uses
 Comoros, UNDP country code
 Commission of inquiry (disambiguation)
 Constitution of India
 Conflict of interest
 Certificate of insurance
 Certificate of incorporation
 Coi (restaurant), restaurant in San Francisco, California
 Dennis Coi (died 1987), Canadian figure skater
 Trịnh Cối (died 1584), Vietnamese de facto ruler of Southern dynasty

See also
 Coy (disambiguation)
 Koi (disambiguation)